Justin "Buck" Buchanan is an American football coach. He is the head coach at Hendrix College in Conway, Arkansas, where he rebooted a program that had been dormant since 1960.

Head coaching record

References

External links
 Hendrix profile

Date of birth missing (living people)
Year of birth missing (living people)
Living people
American football defensive linemen
Austin Kangaroos football coaches
Austin Kangaroos football players
Hendrix Warriors football coaches
Louisiana Christian Wildcats football coaches